Leucine rich repeat containing 15 is a cell membrane-expressed protein. In humans it is encoded by the LRRC15 gene. It is located on chromosome 3 at 3q29. It belongs to the LRR superfamily, which is involved in cell–cell and cell–ECM interactions.  

Preliminary evidence indicates that expression may be related to the severity of COVID-19  and that it is an inhibitory accessory factor for SARS-CoV-2 cell entry. 

LRRC15 lacks obvious intracellular domains. LRRC15 displays a highly restricted expression pattern, but is expressed in areas that make up innate immune barriers such as the placenta, skin, activated fibroblasts in wounds, and lymphoid tissues such as the spleen. 

LRRC15 may play some role in innate immunity.  

LRRC15 is aberrantly expressed in cancer. It is highly expressed in CAFs within the stroma of numerous solid tumors and directly expressed in mesenchymal tumors such as glioblastoma, sarcomas, and melanoma.

See also 
 Leucine-rich repeat
 ACE2

References

Further reading